Arturo Álvarez (29 December 1919 – 2015) was a Peruvian swimmer. He competed in the men's 100 metre freestyle at the 1936 Summer Olympics.

References

External links
 

1919 births
2015 deaths
Peruvian male freestyle swimmers
Olympic swimmers of Peru
Swimmers at the 1936 Summer Olympics
Sportspeople from Lima
20th-century Peruvian people
21st-century Peruvian people